The 2006 AFL season was the 110th season of the Australian Football League (AFL), the highest level senior Australian rules football competition in Australia, which was known as the Victorian Football League until 1989. The season featured sixteen clubs, ran from 30 March until 30 September, and comprised a 22-game home-and-away season followed by a finals series featuring the top eight clubs.

The premiership was won by the West Coast Eagles for the third time, after it defeated  by one point in the AFL Grand Final.

Pre-season competition

 3.10.5 (92) defeated  1.10.15 (84) in the 2006 NAB Cup Final. The game was held at AAMI Stadium, with an attendance of 30,707.

Premiership season

Round 1

Round 2

Round 3

Round 4

Round 5

Round 6

Round 7

Round 8

Round 9

Round 10

Round 11

Round 12

Round 13

Round 14

Round 15

Round 16

Round 17

Round 18

Round 19

Round 20

Round 21

Round 22

Ladder

Ladder progression

Finals series

Week one

Week two

Week three

Week four

Awards
The 2006 All-Australian Team has been announced, with 10 debutants and Brad Johnson named as captain.

Best and fairests

Adelaide: Simon Goodwin
Brisbane: Simon Black
Carlton: Lance Whitnall
Collingwood: Alan Didak
Essendon: Scott Lucas
Fremantle: Matthew Pavlich
Geelong: Paul Chapman
Hawthorn: Sam Mitchell

Kangaroos: Brady Rawlings
Melbourne: James McDonald
Port Adelaide: Brendon Lade
Richmond: Kane Johnson
St Kilda: Nick Riewoldt
Sydney: Adam Goodes
West Coast: Chris Judd
Western Bulldogs: Brad Johnson

Notable events
The Melbourne Cricket Ground was unavailable until round 4, due to its use as the main athletics stadium at the 2006 Commonwealth Games, which concluded just four days prior to the season starting.
This marked the Bulldogs' first victory over Essendon since inflicting their only defeat of the 2000 season. Despite a first round thrashing of reigning premiers , in which Lloyd kicked eight goals on Leo Barry, Essendon would suffer its worst season since 1933, winning only two further matches and drawing one against , and just avoiding the wooden spoon to the Blues on percentage.
 In Round 5,  and 's game ended in controversy after the final siren was not heard by umpires, with the extra time allowing St Kilda to level the scores – the result was changed by the AFL commission later in the week on the basis that the timekeeper had failed to perform his duties.
 The amended result proved crucial to the end-of-season ladder standings, because had the draw stood, St Kilda would have finished in the top four at the expense of reigning premiers Sydney, which would've finished fifth and therefore missed out on the double chance in the finals.
 A struggling Richmond team defeated league-leaders Adelaide in round 8 in an often-discussed game. To counteract Adelaide's strong flood, Richmond slowly built up a lead by patiently controlling the football without ever kicking to a contest, a move described as both boring and brilliant. In the final quarter, Adelaide were forced to switch to man-on-man tactics, almost erasing the deficit, but falling three points short. In executing this plan, Richmond took 181 marks, which is the highest amount ever (recorded since 1987).
 In round 8, Brendan Fevola became the first player to kick all of his team's goals in a game since Mark Arceri in 1991 (also while playing for Carlton, kicking their only goal). Of Carlton's 4.10 (34), Fevola contributed 4.5 (29), Simon Wiggins scored two behinds, and three behinds were rushed. He also became the first player in 41 years to win a Coleman Medal from the wooden spoon winning side.
 St Kilda broke two long winning droughts at the SCG and the Gabba by beating Sydney and Brisbane in rounds 11 and 22 respectively. The latter match was Michael Voss' final game for the Lions.
The remainder of the top eight were filled by teams based in Victoria.
 Bottom teams  and  had a draw in round 16, 2006. Carlton's Eddie Betts scored the match-tying goal with under one minute remaining to deny Essendon what would have been just their second win for the season. Essendon would eventually achieve that the following week. This match was dubbed the "Bryce Gibbs Cup", named after the young Glenelg midfielder who was expected to be, and ultimately was, drafted with the first pick at the end of the year, by the media as both teams were firmly rooted to the bottom of the ladder leading into their match.
 In the second Qualifying Final,  beat minor premiers  by a solitary point, the final scores reading 85 to 84. When the teams met again in the grand final, the final scores were also 85 to 84, but it was West Coast that claimed the victory.
For Smith, this was his final AFL game.

Player changes

Debuts

Retirements

End of season

John Barker –  
Mark Chaffey – 
Barnaby French – 
Saverio Rocca – 
Jarrad Schofield – 
Brad Scott – 
Greg Stafford –   

Chad Morrison  – 
Adam Kingsley  – 
Stephen Powell  – 
Justin Peckett  – 
Michael Voss –  (due to being contracted until the end of the 2007 AFL season he was still on Brisbane's list in 2007)
Rohan Smith  – 
Drew Banfield –

Club captains

Delistings

Jayden Attard – 
Matthew Ball – 
Matthew Bishop – 
Luke Forsyth – 
Ben Hart – 
Clark Keating – 
Andrew Kellaway – 

Troy Makepeace – 
Marty Pask – 
Justin Perkins – 
Mark Powell – 
Cameron Thurley –

Trades

See also
 2006 AFL finals series
 2006 Australian football code crowds
 List of 2006 AFL debuts
 Collingwood Magpies 2006 Season
 Sydney Swans 2006 Season
 List of Australian Football League premiers

References

 2006 season results – AFL Tables

 
Australian Football League seasons
AFL season